The East Liverpool Railroad Bridge is an abandoned bridge that once connected railroads of the Bayard Branch of the Pittsburgh, Cincinnati, Chicago and St. Louis Railroad, connecting Chester, West Virginia to East Liverpool, Ohio. The bridge was upstream of the Chester Bridge that operated from 1897 to 1969, when the bridge was demolished for US Route 30.

See also
 List of crossings of the Ohio River

Railroad bridges in Ohio
Railroad bridges in West Virginia
Demolished bridges in the United States
Bridges over the Ohio River